Carlos Enrique Mendoza Loayza (born October 19, 1992) is a Bolivian footballer currently playing for Real Potosí.

Club career
He played for Magallanes of the Primera B Chilena.

International career
He played for Bolivia U-17 in the South American Under-17 Football Championship Chile 2009.

References
 Profile at BDFA 
 

1992 births
Living people
Footballers from La Paz
Association football defenders
Bolivian footballers
Bolivian expatriate footballers
C.D. Huachipato footballers
Magallanes footballers
Club Real Potosí players
Chilean Primera División players
Primera B de Chile players
Expatriate footballers in Chile